The 2003 FC Barcelona Dragons season was the 11th and final season for the franchise in the NFL Europe League (NFLEL). The team was led by head coach Jack Bicknell in his 11th year, and played its home games at Mini Estadi in Barcelona, Catalonia, Spain. They finished the regular season in fourth place with a record of five wins and five losses.

Offseason

Free agent draft

Personnel

Staff

Roster

Standings

References

Barcelona
Barcelona Dragons seasons